David Chadwick may refer to:

David Chadwick (physician) (1926–2020), American clinical and research pediatrician, author, founder of  founder of Chadwick Center for Children and Autism Discovery Institute, San Diego
David Chadwick (writer) (born 1945), American writer on Buddhism
David Chadwick (footballer) (born 1943), English retired professional footballer
David Chadwick (politician) (1821–1895), British Liberal Member of Parliament (MP) for Macclesfield 1868–1880
Dave Chadwick (died 1960), Grand Prix motorcycle road racer